Lake Walcott is a reservoir in south central Idaho in the northwestern United States, impounded by Minidoka Dam. The damming of the Snake River by the Minidoka Project formed the 11,000 acre (45 km2) lake beginning in 1909. Bird Island is an island in the lake. The Idaho parks and recreation website lists many activities including fishing, boating, camping and swimming. The Minidoka National Wildlife Refuge and Lake Walcott State Park adjoin the lake and are major attractions in the region.

Notes

External links
EPA: Watershed Lake Walcott

Walcott
Walcott
Walcott
Walcott
Buildings and structures in Blaine County, Idaho
Buildings and structures in Cassia County, Idaho
Buildings and structures in Minidoka County, Idaho
Buildings and structures in Power County, Idaho
Walcott
Minidoka Project